It's Your Choice - Unreleased Live Material From The Your Choice Live Series is a compilation album of unreleased live performances, mostly in the punk genre.  It was released in 1991 through Your Choice Records.

Track listing

Notes
This compilation contains songs that were left off the first wave (YCLS 1-12) of the Your Choice Live Series.

It is unknown if any songs that were played at any of these concerts remain unreleased.

See also 
 Your Choice Live Series Vol.03
 Your Choice Live Series Vol.10
 Your Choice Live Series Vol.12

1991 compilation albums
Record label compilation albums